

Events

April events
 April 13 – The Virginia Central Railroad begins operations through the Blue Ridge Tunnel at Rockfish Gap, Virginia.

May events
 May – First known slip coach working, at Haywards Heath on the London, Brighton and South Coast Railway.
 May 3 – While under lease to Bristol and Exeter Railway, the Somerset Central Railway is extended to Burnham-on-Sea.
 May 31 - Carl Abraham Pihl presents the results of his investigation of the area along the river Drammenselva which concludes that the terrain between Drammen and Randsfjorden, in Norway, is favorable for a rail line.

July events
 June 17 – The Atlantic and North Carolina Railroad opens, operating 95 miles from Goldsboro to New Bern, North Carolina.

August events
 August 23 – The Round Oak rail accident in England kills 14.

October events
 October 30 – The Oriental Railway Company opens the first section of railway in the Ottoman Empire, from İzmir to Seydiköy.

September events
 John Ramsbottom (engineer) on the London and North Western Railway introduces the first Class DX 0-6-0 goods locomotives. There will be 943 engines built to this design, the largest steam locomotive class in the British Isles.

December events
 December 15 – Wien Westbahnhof railway station, the terminal of the Western Railway (Austria) in Vienna, opens.

Unknown date events
 John W. Garrett becomes president of the Baltimore and Ohio Railroad.

Births

February births
 February 18 – Wilhelm Schmidt, German pioneer of superheated steam for use in locomotives (d. 1924).

April births
 April 23 - Leonor F. Loree, president of Baltimore and Ohio Railroad 1901–1903, D&H 1907-1938 and  Kansas City Southern Railway 1918–1920.

December births
 December 20 – David Blyth Hanna, first president of Canadian National Railway (d. 1938).

Deaths

July deaths 
 July 31 – Edward Pease, first promoter of the Stockton and Darlington Railway (b. 1767).

November deaths
 November 25 – Edward Bury, English steam locomotive builder (b. 1794).

References